José Inés García Chávez (Inés Chávez García) was a Mexican military man and bandit who participated in the Mexican Revolution.

Early life 
He was born in Godino, Michoacán, on April 19, 1889. He was the son of Anacleto García and Bartola Chávez.

Career 
He was a cameraman in the Porfiriato (The period that General Porfirio Díaz ruled Mexico as president) and thus fought Santana Rodríguez Palafox in Veracruz. He was part of the group that rose against Victoriano Huerta under Anastasio Pantoja, but when the Carrancistas shot at him, Chávez rose up in arms and joined the Villista Army. He operated in the Abajoña of Michoacán and the States of Jalisco and Guanajuato, recruiting thousands of soldiers.

His fighting style was one of a guerrilla or bandit and his greatest success reached came in 1917. His army was feared in all regions of Michoacán, Jalisco and Guanajuato, for its brutality, especially towards women and children. Between 1915 and 1918, Inés Chávez, torched the towns of Apatzingán, Paracho, Cotija and Degollado, known as "The Attila of Michoacán, Jalisco and Guanajuato", to the control of its army, known as "The Painted Leopards".

Death 
Chávez's death is murky. Some sources claim that he died on January 8, 1918, during the Battle of Huandacareo after assaulting several towns. Other sources say he died of Spanish Influenza during the presidency of Purepero Michoacan, on November 11, 1918, at 5:30 pm.

Bibliography
Notes

References 
 
 - Total pages: 271 

1889 births
1918 deaths
Mexican military personnel killed in action
Deaths from Spanish flu